Cleo may refer to:

Entertainment
 Cleo (play), by Lawrence Wright
 Cleo (2019 Belgian film), a drama
 Cleo (2019 German film), a drama
 Snowtime!, released as Cleo in the United Kingdom, a 2015 Canadian computer-animated 3D film
 Cleo (TV series), a Swedish comedy television series broadcast during 2002 and 2003
 Cleo (group), a South Korean girl group formed in 1999
 "Cleo", a song from the 1994 album There's Nothing Wrong with Love by Built to Spill

Science and technology
 Cleo Communications, a B2B integration software company
 CLEO (particle detector), operated by physicists at Cornell University
 CLEO (router), a satellite payload extending the Internet into space
 "CLEO" (Clear Language for Expressing Orders), the programming language for the LEO computer

People
 Cleo (painter) (1943–2007), pseudonym of French fauvist neo-impressionist artist Clementina Cote
 Cléo (born 1985), nickname of professional football player Cléverson Gabriel Córdova
 Cléo (French singer) (born 1946), stage name of French 1960s singer Chantal Rousselot
 Cleo (Swedish singer) (born 1987), Swedish rap artist, singer and songwriter
 Cleo (Polish singer) (born 1983), stage name of Polish singer-songwriter Joanna Klepko
 Cleo. (English musician) (born 1988), UK singer-songwriter, formerly known as MzBratt
 DJ Cleo (born 1979), South African record producer
 Cleo von Adelsheim (born 1987), German-Chilean actress
 Cleo Brown (1909–1995), American blues and jazz vocalist and pianist
 Cleo Demetriou (born 2001), child actress
 Cleo Fields (born 1962), American lawyer and politician, former member of the United States House of Representatives from Louisiana
 Cleo Higgins (born 1982), of the vocal group Cleopatra
 Cleo Laine (born 1927), jazz singer and actress
 Cleo Lemon (born 1979), Canadian football quarterback
 Cleo Madison (1883–1964), American stage and silent film actress born Lulu Baile
 Cléo de Mérode (1875–1966), French dancer
 Cleo Miller (born 1951), American former football player
 Cleo Moore (1924–1973), American actress
 Cleo A. Noel Jr. (1918–1973), American ambassador to Sudan killed by Black September terrorists
 Cleo A. O'Donnell (1883–1953), American football player and coach
 Cleo Francis Pineau (1893–1972), American World War I flying ace and businessman
 Cléo Pires (born 1982), actress
 Cleo Ridgely (1893–1962), American film actress
 Cleo Rocos (born 1962), British comedian
 Cleo Smith (baseball) (born 1900), American baseball player
 Cleo Smith, Australian girl who was abducted and then found; see Disappearance of Cleo Smith
 Miss Cleo (1962–2016), American self-proclaimed psychic

Fictional characters
 Cleo Finch, in the NBC television drama ER
 Cleo Babbitt, in the CBS soap opera As the World Turns
 Cleo Bellows, a main character in the OPB TV show MythQuest
 Cleo, an anthropomorphic goldfish who first appeared in Disney's Pinocchio
 Cleo, a basset hound who appeared in the American television series The People’s Choice
 Cleo, a purple poodle in the book Clifford the Big Red Dog and the animated television program Clifford the Big Red Dog
 Cleo, the mother lion in the PBS Kids television program Between the Lions
 Cleo, a clone of Queen Cleopatra of Egypt in the MTV animated series Clone High
 Cleo, one of The Catillac Cats, an 1980s animated television series
 Cleo Sertori, from H2O: Just Add Water and a mermaid with hydrokinetic and aerokinetic abilities
 Cleo Carter, from Tutenstein
 Cleo Bernstein, from Crash & Bernstein
 Cleo Telerin, one of the two main protagonists of Cleo and Cuquin
 Cleo, the main protagonist in Pirates: Adventures in Art
 Cleo Graves, a main character in Super Monsters
 Cleo Carter, a character in Tutenstein
 Cleo, from Invisible Sister
 Cleo de Nile, the daughter of the mummy Pharaoh from the Mattel franchise Monster High
 Cléo, the titular protagonist of the French film Cléo from 5 to 7
 Cleo, a dancer from The Next Step
 Cleo, from the mobile game Dragalia Lost

Other uses
 Hurricane Cleo (disambiguation)
 USS Cleo (SP-232), a United States Navy patrol vessel in service from 1917 to 1918
 Cleo TV, an American cable television network targeting Millennial and Gen X black women
 Cleo (magazine), an Australian magazine established in 1972, now active in Indonesia, Malaysia, Singapore, and Thailand
 Chief of police (CLEO, local Chief Law Enforcement Officer)

See also
 Clio (disambiguation)
 Cleopatra (disambiguation)
 Clea, a character in Marvel Comics

English unisex given names
Hypocorisms